F.C. Luxembourg City is a football club, based in Hamm, a quarter of Luxembourg City, in southern Luxembourg.

History
The club was founded on 26 March 2004 after a fusion between FC Hamm 37 and FC RM 86 Luxembourg. They spent their first seasons in the Second Division but clinched promotion to the Luxembourg National Division after the 2006–07 season.

FC RM (Rapid Mansfeldia) 86 Luxembourg was itself founded after FC Rapid Neudorf (founded in 1909) and FC Mansfeldia Clausen-Cents  (founded in 1919) merged in 1986 after both clubs were relegated from their respective divisions. FC Hamm 37 was founded in 1937.

At around the end of the 2021-2022 season, the club changed its name to F.C. Luxembourg City.

Current squad
As of 11 August 2021.

Managers
 Michael Lofy (Dec 25, 2007–May 30, 2008)
 Fernando Gutiérrez (July 1, 2008 – June 30, 2010)
 Alvaro da Cruz (July 1, 2010–Feb 21, 2011)
 Felipe Vila Verde (Feb 21, 2011–Dec 31, 2011)
 Carlo Weis (Jan 1, 2012–Sept 10, 2013)
 Rui Vieira (Sept 10, 2013–Sept 30, 2013)
 Paulo Gomes (Oct 7, 2013–Jul 1, 2016)
 Daniel Santos (Jul 1, 2016–)

References

External links
Official Site

RM Hamm Benfica
Association football clubs established in 2004
2004 establishments in Luxembourg
RM